Micropterix croatica is a species of moth belonging to the family Micropterigidae. It was described by Heath & Kaltenbach, 1984. It is known from Italy, Slovenia and Croatia.

References

External links
lepiforum.de
Picture of Micropterix croatica from www.lepiforum.de

Micropterigidae
Moths described in 1984
Moths of Europe